WJAY (1280 AM) is an American radio station broadcasting an Urban contemporary gospel format, licensed by the FCC to serve the community of Mullins, South Carolina.  As of June 28, 2018, the station license was assigned to Door of Hope Christian Church.

Translators
In addition to the main station, WJAY is relayed by a translator to widen its broadcast area.

References

External links 

JAY
Gospel radio stations in the United States